"Sad Eyes" is a song written and recorded by Robert John, and released in April 1979. It debuted May 19 on the Billboard Hot 100, reaching the top of the chart the week of October 6. It was produced by George Tobin in association with Mike Piccirillo.

Reminiscent of the doo-wop ballads of the 1950s, "Sad Eyes" became one of several non-disco, or disco-influenced, tunes to top the 1979 pop chart.  It was released in April 1979, when many music fans were primarily listening to disco.  In August 1979 there was a cultural anti-disco backlash that encouraged many to turn from disco to pop music instead. "Sad Eyes" is notable as the song that ended the six-week reign of the biggest smash hit of the year, The Knack's "My Sharona".

Chart performance

Weekly charts

Year-end charts

Personnel
Album credits list these musicians involved during the sessions from which "Sad Eyes" was recorded. 
 Robert John - vocals
 Dennis Belfield - bass
 Ed Greene - drums
 Stewart Levine, Mike Thompson - keyboards
 Darlene Love, George Tobin, Edna Wright - vocals
 Bill Neale - guitar
 Mike Piccirillo - engineer, guitar, vocals
 Ryan Ulyate - engineer
 Howard Lee Wolen - percussion, engineer

Cover versions
A cover by American country music group Trader-Price peaked at number 55 on the Billboard Hot Country Singles chart in 1989. Kyle Vincent also recorded the song, released on Absolutely The Best of the 70s, credited to Bo Donaldson and The Heywoods, and produced by Ron Dante.  Another rendition appeared on Robin Lee's album, Black Velvet, released in 1990.

References

External links
 "Sad Eyes" at AllMusic

1979 singles
1989 singles
Robert John songs
Trader-Price songs
Billboard Hot 100 number-one singles
Cashbox number-one singles
Number-one singles in New Zealand
1979 songs
EMI America Records singles